There were fewer than 2,000 ethnic Georgians in France from 1922 to 1939 but around 10,000 (500 students, 2,000 asylum refugees and 8,000 legal residents) at the end of 2013. in 2017 more of 14,500 Georgians in France.

Notable people

People associated with the Democratic Republic of Georgia (1918–1921)
Razhden Arsenidze (1880–1965), minister
Nikolay Chkheidze (1864–1926), president of Parliament
Akaki Chkhenkeli (1874–1959), minister
Benia Chkhikvishvili (1881–1924), politician
Kakutsa Cholokashvili (1888–1930), colonel
Revaz Gabashvili (1882–1969), writer and politician
Evgeni Gegechkori (1881–1954), minister
Giorgi Gvazava (1869–1941), politician
Valiko Jugheli (1887–1924), politician
Noe Khomeriki (1883–1924), minister
Giorgi Kvinitadze (1874–1970), military commander
Vlasa Mgeladze (1868–1943), politician
Samson Pirtskhalava (1972–1952), vice-president of Parliament
Noe Ramishvili (1881–1930), president of Government
Ekvtime Takaishvili (1863–1953), vice-president of Parliament
Irakli Tsereteli (1881–1959), minister
Mikheil Tsereteli (1878–1965), politician
Grigol Uratadze (1880–1959), politician
Noe Zhordania (1868–1953), president of Government

People born in Russia, Georgia or USSR
Goudji Amachoukeli (1941–), goldsmith
Dimitri Amilakhvari (1906–1942), colonel of French Army
Constantin Andronikof (1916–1997), interpreter, translator and writer
Géla Babluani (1979–), film director
Djémal Bjalava (1944–), sculptor
Ekaterine Dadiani (1816–1882), Princess
Salome Dadiani (1848–1913), Princess
Mary Eristavi (1888–1968), Princess
Thorniké Gordadzé (1975–), political scientist
Mamuka Gorgodze (1984–), rugby player
Otar Iosseliani (1934–), film director
Bidzina Ivanishvili (1956–), businessman and politician
Alexandre Jioshvili (1975–), volleyball player
Nino Kirtadzé (1968–), film director
Jaba Kankava (1986–), football player
Elie Mélia (1915–1988), priest
Maria Meriko (1920–1994), actress
Michel Mouskhely (1903–1964), political scientist and jurist
Victoria Ravva (1975–), volleyball player
Viktor Sanikidze (1986–), basketball player
Omar Tourmanaouli (1959–2019), writer and translator
Giorgi Tsintsadze (1986–), basketball player
Ilia Zedginidze (1977–), rugby player
Levan Zourabichvili (1906–1975), president of Association géorgienne en France

People born in France
Maryam d'Abo (1960–), actress
Alex Abouladzé (1945–1978), poet
Marie Amachoukeli (1979–), film director
Ketevan Bagration of Mukhrani (1954–), ambassador of Georgia
Gaston Bouatchidzé (1935–), writer and translator
Hélène Carrère d'Encausse (1929–), permanent secretary of the Académie française,
Florian Chakiachvili (1992–), ice hockey player,
Georges Charachidzé (1930–2010), scholar of the Caucasian cultures,
Serge Davri (1919–2012), actor
Artchil Davrichachvili (1955–), priest
Irakli Davrichewy (1940–), jazzman
Kéthévane Davrichewy (1965–), writer
Patricia Eligoulachvili (1958–), actress
Raphaël Eligoulachvili, musician
Guy Kédia (1934–2016), journalist
Claude de Kemoularia (1922–2016), ambassador of France
Luc Melua (1936–2010), motorist and journalist
Mirian Melua, engineer and journalist
Ethéry Pagava (1932–), prima ballerina
Patrick Topaloff (1944–2010), comedian, singer and actor
Dimitri Yachvili (1980–), rugby union footballer
Grégoire Yachvili (1977–), rugby union footballer
Michel Yachvili (1946–), rugby union footballer
François Zourabichvili (1965–2006), philosopher
Nicolas Zourabichvili (1936–), composer
Salomé Zourabichvili (1952–), President of Georgia

Religion
Saint Nino Georgian Orthodox Church, founded in 1929, in Paris, dépends on Ecumenical Patriarcate of Constantinople through the Conference of Orthodox Bishops in France.

Saint Thamar Georgian Orthodox Church, founded in 2005, in Villeneuve-Saint-Georges (outside of Paris), depends on Georgian Orthodox Church.

See also 
France–Georgia relations
Georgian–French day of Leuville-sur-Orge

External links
  and (Georgian) Georgian Embassy in France 
  and (Georgian) Private Website on Georgian diaspora in France

References 

European diaspora in France
France
 
Middle Eastern diaspora in France
Immigration to France by country of origin